Sirum may refer to:

 SIRUM, Supporting Initiatives to Redistribute Unused Medicine, a social enterprise
 Ssireum, a Korean wrestling style
 Siruma, Camarines Sur, municipality in the Philippines
 Sirom, a village in Lorestan Province, Iran